Gabelmann is a surname. Notable people with the surname include:

 Colin Gabelmann (born 1944), former politician in British Columbia
 Sylvia Gabelmann (born 1958), German politician